Complexin-2 is a protein that in humans is encoded by the CPLX2 gene.

Proteins encoded by the complexin/synaphin gene family are cytosolic proteins that function in synaptic vesicle exocytosis. These proteins bind syntaxin, part of the SNAP receptor. The protein product of this gene binds to the SNAP receptor complex and disrupts it, allowing transmitter release. Two transcript variants encoding the same protein have been found for this gene.

References

External links

Further reading